The Colorado Crush were an arena football team based in Denver, Colorado. They began play as a 2003 Arena Football League expansion team. The Crush played in the Central Division of the American Conference until the Arena Football League suspended operations in 2009. They were last coached by Mike Dailey and owned by a coalition of Denver sports figures led by John Elway.

Negotiations with a Denver ownership group (known not to be the Elway group) were underway for a future AFL expansion franchise in Denver, but it is unclear whether or not it will use the Crush branding or that of the Denver Dynamite, an earlier AFL team. Like the Dallas Desperados, the Crush's branding is partially based on NFL teams (the Denver Broncos and St. Louis Rams, though to a much lesser degree), which could give Pat Bowlen or Stan Kroenke a potential veto over any usage of the Colorado Crush branding. On July 15, 2015, the Crush name was acquired by the Indoor Football League franchise formerly known as the Colorado Ice as the trademark for the name expired in 2014 according to their ownership.

History
On August 8, 2001, the team entered an application for expansion into the Arena Football League. In June 2002, it was announced that John Elway (Co-Owner and Chief Executive Officer), with Stan Kroenke, owner of the Avalanche, the Nuggets, the Rapids, Pepsi Center, & the Altitude Sports network and the majority Broncos owner Pat Bowlen would be bringing an arena football team to Denver. The Crush competed in the Central Division of the American Conference. After a bad inaugural season in 2003, in which they finished 2-14, the Crush rebounded to go 11–5 and make the playoffs in their second year. On June 12, 2005 they won ArenaBowl XIX (19) in Las Vegas' Thomas & Mack Center over the Georgia Force 51–48, in only their third year of existence.

In their fourth year the Crush ended up 11–5, with the American Conference Central title for the second year in a row. In the Divisional Round however, the Crush lost in an upset to the fifth-seeded (and eventual ArenaBowl champion) Chicago Rush 63–46.

The team's mascot was an anthropomorphic bull named "Crusher."

On July 15, 2015, the Indoor Football League franchise previously known as the Colorado Ice announced that they would change their name to the Colorado Crush, but would have no ties to the former AFL franchise.  According to team owner Tom Wigley, the trademark of the Crush name expired the year before meaning that the original Crush ownership no longer had a say in the use of the name.

Highlights
 On Sunday, June 12, 2005, the Crush hosted the American Conference Championship game against their division rival, the Chicago Rush. Colorado had the lead late in the game 43–40 and defensive back Rashad Floyd managed to intercept a touchdown pass from quarterback Matt D'Orazio, but it turns out that he was called for holding. Chicago would tie the game with kicker Keith Gispert's 17-yard field goal. In overtime, the Crush would get the win with Quarterback John Dutton completing a 22-yard touchdown pass to WR/LB Antowone 'Andy' McCullough, sending them to ArenaBowl XIX (where they would eventually win).And won 2 before and 2 after On the AFL's 20 Greatest Highlights Countdown, this game is at #20.
 On Friday, February 6, 2004, in a Week 1 contest against the Las Vegas Gladiators, the Crush were still looking for their first home win in franchise history. In the final 12 seconds of the game, the Crush would have quarterback John Dutton complete a seven-yard touchdown pass to wide receiver Damian Harrell (with a failed two-point conversion), recover an onside kick, and have Dutton complete a 33-yard pass to Harrell. With 12 points in 12 seconds, Colorado would win 43–42 and get their first-ever win at home. On the AFL's 20 Greatest Highlights Countdown, this is at #15.
 On Saturday, February 5, 2005, in a Week 2 home game against their division rival, the Grand Rapids Rampage, quarterback John Dutton would throw a franchise-best eight touchdowns in a 72–56 win, yet this was overshadowed by Rampage quarterback Michael Bishop becoming the very first player in AFL history to run for 100 yards in a single game. On the AFL's 20 Greatest Highlights Countdown, this is at #12.
 In 2019, Crush co-owner Pat Bowlen became the second contributor with significant impact on arena football to be inducted into the Pro Football Hall of Fame. Bowlen died a month before the ceremony.

Coaches

Season-by-season

Players of note

Individual awards

Arena Football Hall of Famers

All-Arena players
The following Crush players were named to All-Arena Teams:
 FB/LB Rich Young (1)
 WR Damian Harrell (1)
 C Kyle Moore-Brown (2)
 DL Aaron McConnell (1)
 DB Rashad Floyd (1)
 OS Damian Harrell (3)
 DS Rashad Floyd (2)
 K Clay Rush (2)

All-Ironman players
The following Crush players have been named to All-Ironman Teams: 
 FB/LB Rich Young (1), Robert Thomas (1)
 WR/LB Kevin McKenzie (1), Willis Marshall (1)
 WR/DB Willis Marshall (2)
 OL/DL Kyle Moore-Brown (2), Chris Snyder (1)

All-Rookie players
The following Crush players have been named to All-Rookie Teams:
 FB/LB Anthony Dunn
 WR Chad Owens
 DL John Syptak

Trivia

The team's main color and name are in reference to the Denver Broncos 1970s defensive squad (the "Orange Crush").

Denver was host to one of the four charter teams, the Denver Dynamite, which won the first-ever ArenaBowl in 1987.

Van Montgomery from the TV show Reba played for the Crush at the end of his football career.

Notes

External links
 Colorado Crush at ArenaFan

 
American football teams established in 2003
American football teams disestablished in 2008
2003 establishments in Colorado
American football teams in Colorado
2008 disestablishments in Colorado